Len Walters may refer to:

 Leonard Walters (born 1931), Canadian boxer
 Len Walters (athlete) (born 1947), English athlete